Run the Jewels 3 is the third studio album by American hip hop duo Run the Jewels, which consists of rappers El-P and Killer Mike. It was self-released through their Run the Jewels, Inc. imprint via RBC Records digitally on December 24, 2016, and physically on January 13, 2017. The album serves as the follow-up to their 2014 album, Run the Jewels 2. It features guest appearances from Danny Brown, Joi, Trina, Boots, Tunde Adebimpe, Zack de la Rocha, and Kamasi Washington. The album was supported by three singles: "Talk to Me", "2100", and "Legend Has It". Similar to Run the Jewels 2, it was released as a free download on their website as well as being physically released on CD and LP.

Much like its predecessors, Run the Jewels 3 received widespread acclaim from critics. It debuted at number 35 on the US Billboard 200, with 23,000 album-equivalent units in its first week, and later peaked at number 13 on the chart.

Background
Run the Jewels 3 was first announced on December 14, 2014. Killer Mike announced that work on the album began in January 2015. On September 27, 2016, El-P confirmed that all of the album had been recorded.

Artwork
In an interview with Spin, Run the Jewels discussed the meaning of the album's cover art:

Promotion
The album's first single, "Talk to Me", was originally released on October 24, 2016, on Adult Swim's 2016 singles program. It was later released as the lead single of the album on November 4, 2016. The album's second single, "2100", was released on November 11, 2016. It features a guest appearance from American musician Boots. The album's third single, "Legend Has It", was released on December 2, 2016. Excerpts from "Legend Has It" were prominently used in the first teaser trailer for the 2018 Marvel movie Black Panther. The first teaser trailer, which premiered during Game 4 of the 2017 NBA Finals, was viewed 89 million times in 24 hours and was more tweeted about than the game itself.

Critical reception

Run the Jewels 3 was met with widespread critical acclaim. At Metacritic, which assigns a normalized rating out of 100 to reviews from mainstream publications, the album received an average score of 88, based on 34 reviews. Aggregator AnyDecentMusic? gave it 8.5 out of 10, based on their assessment of the critical consensus.

In Vice, Robert Christgau said the duo were "funnier, hookier, and kinder as well as brainier and more political" than before, while Chicago Tribune critic Greg Kot called the record "an album that megaphones its restlessness while retaining its wicked sense of fun". Dan Weiss of Consequence said, "So the blessing and the curse of Run the Jewels 3 is that it's still a Run the Jewels album, a promise that every song is good, nothing is bad, and depending on your mood you'll either bask in the lack of tempo changes, pulchritudinous song structures, and surprising hooks, or you'll seek out a more colorful record". Neil Z. Yeung of AllMusic said, "In short, RTJ3 is near perfect in its execution. They're so good at this that it seems almost unfair in its effortlessness". Clayton Purdom of The A.V. Club said, "Three albums deep, Killer Mike and El-P sound as hungry as ever, and the world is still full of Caesars with ripe throats". Paul MacInnes of The Guardian said, "The formula is probably becoming familiar, but its time is now". Roisin O'Connor of The Independent said, "Killer Mike and El-P bring typically sharp, visceral observations, chugging beats and superb guest artists onto their most successful studio effort to date". Joe Madden of NME said, "There's tonnes of fun to be had from absorbing the duo's fury, and El-P's sci-fi beats are as thrillingly big 'n' bad as ever". Sheldon Pearce of Pitchfork said, "It isn't quite as punchy as RTJ2, which was brutish in its tactics, with nonstop bangs and thrills, but RTJ3 is a triumph in its own right that somehow celebrates the success of a seemingly unlikely friendship and mourns the collapse of a nation all at once".

Keith Harris of Rolling Stone said, "Lyrically, there no lack of muscular skill-flexing. ... Run the Jewels can still detonate rhymes like a Molotov cocktail lobbed into a CVS, but now they're strategizing for the long war ahead". Joseph Mathieu of Exclaim! said, "If "bloody", "urgent", "enraged" and "heartening" were enough description to sum up El-P and Killer Mike's latest Run the Jewels album, this review could end here. But they aren't; this late 2016 LP, along with the duo's various collaborative tracks with several DJs and rappers all year, have officially placed RTJ high on the shelf of the "hard to describe" category". Steve "Flash" Juon of RapReviews said, "The irony of releasing three beautiful albums it that even a great album like RTJ3 can still wind up being ranked third in descending order. As good as it is nothing here can top "Crown", "Angel Duster" or "Early" for me. By no means is this in any way a negative. It's like saying you're going to listen to your third favorite Ice Cube or third favorite Michael Jackson album—you're still going to wind up listening to some brilliant shit over and over again no matter what". Scott Glaysher of XXL said, "In the grand scheme of rap music, Killer Mike and El-P get more and more niche with each project they release together and this new album is no different. If this dynamic duo can keep their rebellious spirit alive without beating it to death, they'll continue to thrive". Jesse Cataldo of Slant Magazine said, "The level of discourse on Run the Jewels 3 may be higher than your standard hip-hop grandstanding, and the references may be current and the beats may be more intense, but the album remains too entrenched in the grammar of the past to ever feel entirely fresh".

Year-end lists

Commercial performance
Run the Jewels 3 debuted at number 35 on the US Billboard 200, with 23,000 album-equivalent units in its first week. As of January 2017, the album has sold 41,000 copies.

Track listing

Notes
  signifies an additional writer
 "Kill Your Masters" features uncredited vocals by Zack de la Rocha

Personnel
Credits adapted from the album's liner notes.

Run the Jewels
 El-P – vocals, producer, engineer, art direction
 Killer Mike – vocals

Musicians

 Trackstar the DJ – scratches (2, 7)
 Michael Marie Render – additional vocals (5)
 Grace Strother – additional vocals (5)
 Gabrielle Strother – additional vocals (5)
 Matt Sweeney – additional guitar (5, 6)
 'Lil Zoby Poundstone Schwartz – additional drum programming (7)
 Danger Mouse – piano (8)
 Tunde Adebimpe – additional vocals (8)
 Boots – additional vocals (9)
 Mike Bones – additional guitar (11)
 Kamasi Washington – horns (13)
 Nadezhda Tolokonnikova – additional vocals (14)

Technical
 Joey Raia – mixing
 Joe LaPorta – mastering
 Leon "Young Leon" Kelly – audio recording, engineer
 Little Shalimar – co-producer, engineer
 Wilder Zoby – co-producer, engineer
 Johannes Raassina – additional audio recording (1)
 Todd Monfalcone – additional audio recording (8, 13)
 Boots – co-producer (10)
 Daddy Kev – additional recording (14)

Design
 Nick Gazin – artwork
 Troy Hahn – layout design
 Virginia Poundstone – statue production oversight
 Tim Saccenti – art direction, photography, artwork
 Paige Tooker – statue creation

Charts

Release history

See also 
 Run the World Tour

References

2016 albums
Albums produced by El-P
Run the Jewels albums
Mass Appeal Records albums
Albums free for download by copyright owner
Sequel albums